Amaya Valdemoro Madariaga (born August 18, 1976, in Alcobendas, Community of Madrid) is a Spanish former basketball player. She won three Women's National Basketball Association (WNBA) championship rings with the Houston Comets, one EuroLeague with Dorna Godella, as well as eight Spanish leagues and one Russian Premier League. She was the Russian League Player of the Year in 2006.

With the national team she competed in two Olympic Games, Athens 2004 and Beijing 2008. won a bronze medal at the 2010 FIBA World Championship and won 5 medals at EuroBasket women, including a gold medal at the 2013 EuroBasket Women.

Club career

1992-1998 Spanish clubs 
She made her debut in the Spanish league in 1992, at only 16 years of age, with Dorna Godella, winning the national league and the 1992–93 Euroleague. In the 1993–1994 season, she won the league, the cup and was Euroleague runner-up. With her following club, Pool Getafe she won back-to-back league and cup titles in 1997 and 1998, and again Euroleague runner-up in 1998.

1998-2000 WNBA 
Valdemoro was selected with the 30th overall pick (3rd round) in the 1998 WNBA Draft by the Houston Comets, winning three consecutive championships rings in 1998, 1999 and 2000.

1998-2005 Spanish clubs 
After playing for both Houston Comets and Halcón Viajes Salamanca for three seasons, she went back to Valencia, having the club changed its name to Ros Casares, going to win 2 leagues and 3 cups. She would have a brief spell at Brazilian team Unimed/Americana in 2004.

2005-2008 Russian clubs 
She spent the next three seasons in the Russian Premier League, with BC Volgaburmash Samara and then CSKA Moscow, winning 1 league and 3 cups.

2008-2013 Spanish clubs 
Returning to play for Ros Casares Valencia, she won back-to-back league and cup titles in 2009 and 2010, as well as Euroleague runner-up in 2009–10 EuroLeague. She spent two more seasons in her home town, playing for Rivas Ecópolis, winning the 2011 Spanish cup and leading the team to the 2011–12 EuroLeague final.

After a brief stint in Turkey, her last club was Real Canoe NC.

National team
She made her debut with Spain women's national basketball team at the age of 17. She played with the senior team for 18 years, from 1995 to 2013. She is one of the most capped players with a total of 258 caps and 10.6 PPG. She participated in two Olympic Games (Athens 2004 and Beijing 2008), four World Championships and eight European Championships, retiring from the national team as captain and champion in the 2013 EuroBasket:
  1993 FIBA Europe Under-16 Championship for Women (youth)
  1994 FIBA Europe Under-18 Championship for Women (youth)
 9th 1995 Eurobasket
 5th 1997 Eurobasket
 5th 1998 World Championship
 5th 2002 World Championship
  2003 Eurobasket
 6th 2004 Summer Olympics
  2005 Eurobasket
 8th 2006 World Championship
  2007 Eurobasket (MVP)
 5th 2008 Summer Olympics
  2009 Eurobasket
  2010 World Championship
 9th 2011 Eurobasket
  2013 Eurobasket

References

1976 births
Living people
Basketball players at the 2004 Summer Olympics
Basketball players at the 2008 Summer Olympics
Basketball players from the Community of Madrid
Houston Comets players
Olympic basketball players of Spain
Real Canoe NC basketball players
Small forwards
Spanish expatriate basketball people in Russia
Spanish expatriate basketball people in the United States
Spanish women's basketball players
People from Alcobendas